The 1995 Greenlandic Men's Football Championship was the 25th edition of the Greenlandic Men's Football Championship. The final round was held in Sisimiut. It was won by Kugsak-45 for the first time in its history.

Qualifying stage

North Greenland

Disko Bay

Central Greenland

Group A

Group B

South Greenland

Last Chance Qualifier

Final round

Pool 1

Pool 2

Playoffs

Semi-finals

Seventh-place match

Fifth-place match

Third-place match

Final

See also
Football in Greenland
Football Association of Greenland
Greenland national football team
Greenlandic Men's Football Championship

References

Greenlandic Men's Football Championship seasons
Green
Green
Foot